The 2011 Three National Figure Skating Championships included the Czech Republic, Slovakia, and Poland. The event was held on December 16–18, 2010 at the DOXXbet Arena in Žilina, Slovakia. Medals were awarded in the disciplines of men's singles, ladies' singles, pair skating, and ice dancing on the senior, junior, and novice levels.

The three national championships were held simultaneously and the results were then split by country. The top three skaters from each country formed their national podiums. This was the fifth consecutive season that the Czech and Slovak Championships were held simultaneously, and the third in which Poland also participated.

Medals summary

Czech Republic

Slovakia

Poland

Senior results

Men

Ladies

Pairs

Ice dancing

Junior results

Ice dancing

External links
 2011 Three National Championships results

2010 in figure skating
2011 in figure skating
2011
2011
2011
2010 in Czech sport
2010 in Slovak sport
Fig
Czech Republic–Slovakia relations